Arum dioscoridis, commonly known as the Spotted arum, is a plant of the arum family (Araceae).

The plant was described by James Edward Smith in Flora Graeca. The species is named after the ancient Greek physician and botanist Pedanius Dioscorides.

The plant is native to forests in the east of the Mediterranean in southern Turkey, Cyprus, Greece and the Middle East.

Description
In winter appear green, arrow-shaped leaves. In spring, the short-stalked inflorescence appears consisting of a black, rod-shaped spadix surrounded by a yellow-green, purple-mottled brown or even purple bract (spathe). The color pattern of the spathe is variable, and multiple varieties have been described based on different patterns.

The female flowers are located at the bottom of the spadix; above are the male flowers; and the top is a sterile area (appendix). The spadix emits a pungent smell that attracts flies as pollinators.

Cultivation
The plant can be grown as an ornamental plant in rock gardens Mediterranean regions. In the Benelux, the plant can be grown indoors as a pot plant. The plant can be propagated by seeding.

References

dioscoridis
Flora of Greece
Flora of Cyprus
Flora of Lebanon
Flora of Turkey
Taxa named by James Edward Smith